The Matraman Station (MTR) is the KRL Commuterline train station located on the border between Kebon Manggis, Matraman and Kampung Melayu, Jatinegara, East Jakarta, Indonesia. This station is adjacent to the Gunung Antang localization area and was built as part of the Manggarai–Cikarang double-double track project.

History 

The plan for Matraman Station has been discussed since 2011, along with plans for new Mampang, Roxy, Tomang, and Bandengan stations. The discourse was then disclosed again in 2014, before the Manggarai–Cikarang double-double track project was still in the land acquisition stage.

Matraman Station was built near the former Kebon Pala Stop (km 1+471). The reason for its construction is to break up the passenger density at Manggarai Station and Jatinegara Station. Workers who work near Matraman Station can get on and off from Matraman, thereby reducing the number of passengers in Manggarai and Jatinegara.

On June 17 2022, the Directorate General of Railways conducted a trial of passenger services at Matraman Station. This trial was originally planned to start on June 16, 2022, but was pushed back. The trial lasted for a week.

Two days later, on 19 June 2022, the Minister of Transportation Budi Karya Sumadi accompanied by the Indonesian Minister of Cooperatives and Small and Medium Enterprises Teten Masduki, inaugurated the Matraman Station. Also present at the soft launching were Director General of Railways Zulfikri, President Director of PT KAI Didiek Hartantyo, President Director of KAI Commuter Mukti Jauhari, representatives of disabilities, and a number of related officials.

Building and layout 
This station was made with the concept of a shelter (stop) because it only serves passengers going up and down and does not make arrangements for train travel like Jatinegara and Manggarai Stations. This station has only two railway lines.

This station has two floors. The 1st floor is a place to accommodate all facilities and shops, while the 2nd floor is the station platform.

The Matraman Station will be integrated with Transjakarta buses at the Matraman Baru BRT Station.

Train services

Commuter

Supporting Transportation

Gallery

References 

Railway stations in Jakarta